A Final Reckoning is a 1928 American silent Western film serial directed by Ray Taylor, set in colonial Australia. The film is considered to be lost. It is based on an 1887 novel by G. A. Henty.

Cast
 Newton House as Ruben Whitney
 Louise Lorraine as Miss Whitney, Ruben's Sister
 Jay Wilsey as Captain Wilson (as Buffalo Bill Jr.)
 Edmund Cobb as Black Jack
 Frank Clark as Jim Whitney

See also
 List of American films of 1928
 List of film serials
 List of film serials by studio

References

External links
 

1928 films
1928 lost films
1928 Western (genre) films
American silent serial films
American black-and-white films
Bushranger films
Films based on British novels
Films directed by Ray Taylor
Films set in colonial Australia
Lost Western (genre) films
Lost American films
Silent American Western (genre) films
Universal Pictures film serials
1920s American films
Silent American drama films